= Grandy's Pond formation =

Geologic formation in Canada

- Stratigraphic range: Neoproterozoic
- Type: Formation
- Unit of: Long Cove Group

Location
- Region: Newfoundland
- Country: Canada
- Occurrence of the Grandy's Pond formation in southeastern Newfoundland

The Grandy's Pond formation is a formation cropping out in Newfoundland.
